E3 ubiquitin-protein ligase SMURF2 is an enzyme that in humans is encoded by the SMURF2 gene which is located at chromosome 17q23.3-q24.1.

Interactions 

SMURF2 has been shown to interact with:

 Mothers against decapentaplegic homolog 1,
 Mothers against decapentaplegic homolog 2,
 Mothers against decapentaplegic homolog 3, 
 Mothers against decapentaplegic homolog 7, 
 SCYE1, 
 SMURF1,  and
 Ubiquitin C. 

 TOP2A,

References

Further reading